Our Jesus Story, is a 2020 Nigerian religious drama film directed by Tchidi Chikere and produced by Ojiofor Ezeanyaeche for O.J Production. The film stars Frederick Leonard in the lead role as Jesus the Christ, whereas Zack Orji, Sam Dede, Eucharia Anunobi and Adjetey Anang made supportive roles. This is the first biblical African new interpretation for the Jesus the Christ story with an all-black African cast and crew.

The film made its premier on 27 March 2020 in Imax Cinema in Lekki, Lagos. The film received positive reviews from critics.

Cast
 Frederick Leonard as Jesus the Christ
 Zack Orji
 Sam Dede
 Eucharia Anunobi
 Adjetey Anang
 Ofia Mbaka
 Tchidi Chikere

References 

2020 films
English-language Nigerian films
Nigerian drama films
2020s English-language films